The 1992–93 Western Kentucky Hilltoppers men's basketball team represented Western Kentucky University during the 1992–93 NCAA Division I men's basketball season. The Hilltoppers were led by coach Ralph Willard and future NBA player Darnell Mee.  The team was Sun Belt Conference runners-up and won Sun Belt Basketball tournament.  They received the conference's automatice bid to the 1993 NCAA Division I men's basketball tournament where they advanced to the Sweet Sixteen.  Mee and Mark Bell made the All-Conference and SBC Tournament team; Mee was also tournament MVP.

Schedule

|-
!colspan=6| Regular season

|-

|-
!colspan=6| 1993 Sun Belt Conference men's basketball tournament

|-
!colspan=6| 1993 NCAA Division I men's basketball tournament

References

Western Kentucky
Western Kentucky Hilltoppers basketball seasons
Western Kentucky
Western Kentucky Basketball, Men's
Western Kentucky Basketball, Men's